Evabritt Strandberg (born 7 April 1943) is a Swedish actress and singer.

Evabritt Strandberg belongs to the artist-rich family Strandberg. She is half-sister to Charlott Strandberg and granddaughter to Olle Strandberg.

She has been married to Sven Wollter (they have the daughter Lina Wollter) and to Lars-Erik Berenett (they have the son Matti Berenett).

Strandberg wanted to be veterinary physician, but her grades in mathematics, physics, and chemistry were not good enough. Instead, she wanted to work at theatre; she studied at Dramatens elevskola 1962–65.

Strandberg worked at the Royal Dramatic Theatre 1965–67 and at Riksteatern 1967–68. 1968–83 she was engaged at Gothenburg City Theatre.

As a singer, Strandberg released her LP En sång ett vapen in 1965. She has interpreted songs by Jacques Brel, Édith Piaf, Lars Forssell and Cornelis Vreeswijk. In 1995, she received the Cornelis Vreeswijk Scholarship with the motive "En sångkonst av stor bärighet och styrka, rå och sovrad intensitet som kongenialt gestaltar tillvarons gläde och sorg, en formulering som även kan räcka hennes skådespeleri" ("A song-art of great buoyancy and strength, raw and sifted intensity which congenially portrays life's happy and sad, a formulation that also may suffice her acting").

Filmography

Film

Television

References

External links 

Evabritt Strandberg on Riksipedia (Riksteatern) 
Evabritt Strandberg on Swedish Film Database

Living people
1943 births
Swedish women singers
Swedish actresses
Singers from Stockholm
Actresses from Stockholm